Cha University is a private university in Pocheon and Pangyo, Seongnam, Gyeonggi-do, South Korea. It was founded on the basis of the three philosophies: Christianity, Humanism, and Academia.

History
Cha University was founded in 1997 by Dr. Kwang-Yul Cha, a world-renowned scientist in reproductive medicine and the owner of Hollywood Presbyterian Medical Center in Los Angeles. Dr. Cha is the chairman of CHA Medical Group which is Cha Medical Centers in Gangnam, Bundang, Gumi, and Singapore medical group, City Fertility Centre, Cha University, Cha Biocomplex which is coordinated with Research and development in one place.

Characteristics 
As an effort to recruit competitive students, the medical school decided to offer a guaranteed full-ride academic scholarship upon admission for the majority of students, which gained immense popularity among pre-med college graduates. Although there is no reliable ranking system for medical schools in Korea, this medical school was the highest in medical schools in the nation in 2006 with regard to MEET scores, which is equivalent to the MCAT in the United States, despite its short history. It is also known that its graduates have the highest pass rate in Korea Medical Licensing Exam (KMLE).

Undergraduate colleges 
 College of Life Sciences
 College of Health Sciences
 College of Nursing
 College of Pharmacy
 College of Integrated Social Science

Graduate schools 
 Medical School
Department of Biomedical Science
 Department of Medical Science
 Department of Nursing
 Department of Pharmacy
 Department of Active Aging Industry
 Graduate School of Integrated Medicine
 Graduate School of Health Industry
 Graduate School of Clinical Pharmacy
 Graduate School of Sports Medicine
Graduate School of Art Therapy
Graduate School of Clinical Counseling Psychology
CHA Business School : MBA

References

External links 

Medical schools in South Korea